Interstate 10 (I-10) is the major east–west Interstate Highway in the Southern United States. In the U.S. state of Texas, it runs east from Anthony, at the border with New Mexico, through El Paso, San Antonio, and Houston to the border with Louisiana in Orange, Texas. At just under , the Texas segment of I-10, maintained by the Texas Department of Transportation, is the longest continuous untolled freeway in North America that is operated by a single authority. It is also the longest stretch of Interstate Highway with a single designation within a single state. Mile marker 880 and its corresponding exit number in Orange, Texas, are the highest numbered mile marker and exit on any freeway in North America. After widening was completed in 2008, a portion of the highway west of Houston is now also believed to be the widest in the world, at 26 lanes when including feeders.

More than a third of I-10's length is located in Texas. Likewise, Orange is only  from the eastern terminus of I-10 in Jacksonville, Florida.

Route description

West Texas
I-10 enters Texas northwest of El Paso near Anthony and runs southward, alongside US Route 85 (US 85) and US 180. US 85 splits off in West El Paso at exit 13 (Sunland Park Drive, Paisano Drive), where US 85 heads south on Paisano Drive, through downtown El Paso, and ends at the Stanton Street Bridge and the border with Mexico via local streets. As of the summer of 2016, the stretch of I-10 that runs through El Paso was in the midst of a major construction project, which sought to link North/South Desert Boulevard (the westside frontage roads) with Gateway East and Gateway West (the central and eastside frontage roads). Several miles of frontage road were being built where none previously existed. I-10/US 180 continues turning to the east towards downtown El Paso. I-10 then meets I-110 and US 54 (the "Patriot Freeway", or North–South Freeway) in a complex, three-level interchange referred to by locals as the "Spaghetti Bowl". I-10 and US 180 diverge east of downtown at exit 23B (Paisano Drive) as US 180 heads northeast (joining US 62 and Paisano Drive northbound) and I-10 to the southeast. I-10's frontage-road system is called Desert Boulevard where it runs through West El Paso, and Gateway Boulevard where it runs through Central and East El Paso. Among these stretches of the highway.

Where I-10 leaves the Rio Grande, it runs primarily eastward. Just before entering the city of Van Horn, at the border of Hudspeth and Culberson counties, I-10 leaves the Mountain Time Zone and enters the Central Time Zone. Just east of Kent, the western terminus of I-20 intersects with I-10. I-20 heads northeast towards the Dallas–Fort Worth area, and I-10 continues to run eastward. US 67 runs alongside I-10 for a stretch; the La Entrada al Pacifico trade corridor is a part of this stretch of I-10. Near Junction, I-10 begins a more southeastwardly course as it runs toward the San Antonio metropolitan area. Near Comfort, I-10 and US 87 begin to run alongside each other until they reach San Antonio.

Because I-10 crosses some of the most rural and sparsely inhabited parts of the United States, notably the Trans-Pecos Region, it has several unique features that differentiate it from other interstate highways. I-10 is one of the very few interstates that has at-grade intersections (roads that intersect it at a 90-degree angle, rather than crossing via an overpass or underpass with on and off ramps). These are private-access roads (mostly from large ranches), and are found over a limited stretch in western Texas.

The stretch from Kerr County to El Paso County has an  speed limit, which was the highest in the nation, until the opening of the  southern section of Texas State Highway 130 (SH 130) on October 24, 2012.

San Antonio and Central Texas

I-10 is the busiest freeway in San Antonio with nearly 200,000 vehicles on an average day. On the northwest side, I-10 is known as the McDermott Freeway, named after Robert F. McDermott, former dean of the United States Air Force Academy as well as CEO of San Antonio-based USAA. The highway enters the city concurrently with US 87 from the north and travels more in a north–south direction into downtown, rather than the east–west designation found on the Interstate Highway signs.  The section of I-10 from Ralph Fair Road (FM 3351) to La Cantera Parkway includes HOV lanes for both directions.  The northern section from Loop 1604 to downtown serves one of the fastest growing areas of the city. A majority of the region's suburban office space is located along the corridor as are the headquarters for USAA, gasoline refiner and retailer Valero, South Texas Medical Center, the University of Texas at San Antonio (UTSA), Six Flags Fiesta Texas, and the Shops at La Cantera. I-10 intersects I-410 for the first time near Balcones Heights, a suburban city within San Antonio. The construction of a four-level interchange to accommodate the growing northwest side has been completed. Heavy commercial development dominates the landscape between I-410 and Loop 1604. Inside I-410, the route is lined with light industrial and residential areas.

As I-10 heads south into downtown, it splits into an upper level with three lanes in each direction and a lower level with two lanes in each direction. It was necessary to design the freeway this way in order to accommodate the amount of traffic heading into downtown and to fit into the narrow corridor that was surrounded by existing infrastructure. I-10 meets I-35 on the northwest side of downtown and it overlaps I-35 south to form the west side of the downtown loop. The I-35 exit numbers are carried through during the concurrency. I-10 and I-35 end their concurrency at a four-level interchange on the southwest side of downtown with the junction of US 90 from the west. I-35 continues to the south and I-10 and US 90 run concurrently to the east to form the south side of the downtown loop. This section of I-10 is known as the Jose Lopez Freeway, named after the Medal of Honor recipient. I-10 heads east away from downtown through mainly residential neighborhoods on the east side of San Antonio. I-10's concurrency with US 87 ends just east of downtown where US 87 heads south towards Victoria. I-10 provides access to the AT&T Center, home of the San Antonio Spurs, and to the Freeman Coliseum. Leaving San Antonio, I-10 again passes I-410 and Loop 1604. I-10 is known as the 90th Infantry Division Memorial Highway on this stretch east of San Antonio. I-10 and US 90 continue their concurrency until they diverge in Seguin. They continue from there on to Houston nearly paralleling each other with short stints of overlaps along the route.

Houston and East Texas

From the western suburb of Katy to downtown, I-10 is known as the Katy Freeway in Houston. This section was widened in 2008 to as many as 26 total lanes, counting the six lanes of the access (frontage/feeder) road, which feature traffic signals, and driveway access and are not limited-access and therefore not technically part of the freeway itself but are directly adjacent. Between the West Beltway and the West Loop, the Katy Freeway features a basic configuration of 14 lanes, featuring seven lanes each direction. This cross-section swells with auxiliary lanes, ramp lanes, and the inclusion of the frontage access roads, although those lanes are controlled by traffic signals. Including auxiliary lanes, ramp lanes, and the access frontage roads, the minimum lane count is 22 total lanes. In this section, the width is 24 lanes at multiple locations and up to 26 lanes east of Gessner Road (12 main lanes, eight lanes of access roads, and six mid-freeway HOT/HOV lanes). From the Fort Bend county line to I-610, there is a minimum of four main lanes in each direction. The maximum number of undivided lanes at any point on the freeway is nine in the eastbound direction approaching Antoine Drive (though this includes one exit-only lane); this is one of the widest sections of undivided highway in a single direction in the world. The widest right-of-way, occurs at the Katy Freeway's intersection with Bunker Hill; at that point, the expansion plans called for six main lanes plus two toll lanes in each direction along with 10 lanes on the feeder/frontage roads. While this section still features 14 through continuous lanes through the Bunker Hill interchange, when auxiliary lanes, ramp lanes, and the frontage access roads are included, the actual striping after construction delineates 29 lanes, including all 26 of the planned lanes plus an additional lane in each direction to enter or exit the toll lanes and one more turn lane on the eastbound feeder road.

Between I-610 and I-45 west of downtown, the interstate contains at least five main lanes in each direction. Before 2008, this section had traditionally been the widest section of I-10 in the Houston area and the only one with a significant portion below grade. A project completed in 2014 added one extra auxiliary lane in each direction between Shepherd Drive and Taylor Street. In addition, the eastbound feeder road that ends at Studemont was extended to Taylor Street. As I-10 travels through downtown, it junctions with I-45 and I-69/US 59. Both interchanges feature left exits, allowing several lane shifts for through traffic. I-10 provides access to Minute Maid Park, home of the Houston Astros, and also runs through the campus of the University of Houston–Downtown.

The section east of downtown Houston is officially known as the "East Freeway", although it is widely known by locals as the Baytown East Freeway or colloquially shortened to the Beast, due to a marketing push by Baytown, one of the largest cities in the Greater Houston Area. At College Street (US 90), I-10 expands to eight lanes. I-10 meets US 90 again near the recently reconstructed Purple Heart Memorial Bridge over the Neches River; these highways travel concurrently the remainder of the way across the state. I-10 reaches Orange County and passes through the towns of Rose City, Vidor, Pinehurst, and Orange. Business US 90-Y splits off and comes back to I-10 near the Sabine River Bridge over the Sabine River. At the river, I-10 finally leaves Texas and crosses into Louisiana.

History

El Paso and West Texas
I-10 replaced and runs concurrently with US 85 from the New Mexico state line up until the two diverge at mile marker 13. The two highways parallel each other for several miles until US 85 continues to head south to the border with Mexico and I-10 turns east towards Downtown El Paso. Prior to the Interstate Highway system, US 85 ran concurrent with US 80 from the New Mexico border until the two diverged in Downtown El Paso. When I-10 was constructed in downtown El Paso, several blocks were demolished, and a sub-grade trench was built for the freeway. A series of overpasses now carry the preexisting north–south surface streets over the east–west stretch of I-10 through downtown. I-10 replaced US 80 through El Paso and to the southeast and east to the present day junction of I-10 and I-20. US 80 along this route has been completely removed from the highway system in favor of I-10.

At the junction with I-20, I-10 replaced US 290 eastward to the present day junction of I-10 and US 290 southeast of Junction. This section of US 290 was deleted from the highway system. From this point to near Comfort, I-10 replaced SH 27. SH 27 still exists along this stretch, mostly paralleling I-10 to the south. From Comfort southeast to San Antonio, I-10 directly replaced US 87.

Central Texas

I-10 generally follows the alignment of US 87 on the northwest side of San Antonio into downtown. A new alignment was built to the south of downtown for the freeway since it was impossible to upgrade the surface streets in downtown that US 87 and US 90 followed prior to the Interstate Highway System. Southeast of downtown, I-10 curves back to the northeast to connect with the pre-interstate alignment of US 90.

Construction of portions of I-10 were well underway and completed prior to the commissioning of the highway in 1959. The section from Culebra Road to Woodlawn Avenue opened as the first freeway in San Antonio in 1949, but was signed as US 87. Expansion and construction continued in the 1950s, but the bulk of the construction occurred in the 1960s after the interstate was commissioned. The $11 million project to construct the interchange with I-37 was at the time the largest single contract in the history of the state highway commission. The current alignment was completed by 1968.

Rapid growth in San Antonio led to the original highway quickly becoming inadequate, with the result that it has been in perpetual construction and expansion. In the 1980s, the portion just northwest of downtown was reconstructed to add a double deck feature to expand the freeway to five lanes in each direction. In 1990, the interstate had only two lanes in each direction from Loop 1604 to where the double-deck freeway begins near downtown. Recent construction has expanded the freeway to five lanes in each direction from just outside the I-410 loop all the way into downtown. The I-10/I-410 interchange was reconstructed into a four-level stack interchange.

East Texas

When constructed during the 1960s, I-10 between Katy and Houston, known as the Katy Freeway, was built with six to eight lanes wide barring side lanes, being modest by Houston standards because existing traffic demand to the farming area of West Houston was relatively low. As the population and economic activity increased in the area, vehicular traffic increased, reaching an annual average daily traffic (AADT) of 238,000 vehicles just west of the West Loop in 2001.

In 2000, increased traffic levels and congestion led to plans being approved for widening of the freeway to 16 lanes with a capacity for 200,000 cars per day. An old railway running along the north side of the freeway was demolished in 2002 in preparation for construction which began in 2004. The interior two lanes in each direction between SH 6 and west I-610, the Katy Freeway Managed Lanes or Katy Tollway, were built as high-occupancy toll lanes and are managed by the Harris County Toll Road Authority. The section just west of SH 6 to the Fort Bend–Harris county line opened in late June 2006. Two intersections were rebuilt (Beltway 8 and I-610), toll booths were added, together with landscaping as part of Houston's Highway Beautification Project. Most of the section between Beltway 8 and SH 6 had been laid by September 2006 and work was completed in October 2008.

Tolls on the managed lanes vary by vehicle occupancy, axle count and time of day. High occupancy vehicles may travel for free at certain times.

Severe flooding of the Sabine River occurred in March 2016. Days of continuous heavy rains, coupled with the controversial opening of the Toledo Bend Dam and the release of  into the river, caused the closing of I-10. The water level in Deweyville rose to 130-year record heights, prompting a joint decision by the Texas Department of Transportation (TxDOT) and the Louisiana Department of Transportation and Development (LaDOTD) to close I-10 for four days near Orange.

Much of I-10 between Houston and Beaumont was shut down in late August 2017 as Hurricane Harvey inundated the Houston and East Texas area with record rainfall. In 2020, I-10 between Beaumont and the Louisiana state line was shut down due to debris and heavy rain caused by Hurricanes Delta and Laura.

Exit list

Related highways

I-10 has four business loops within the state. All of these routes are in the far western Trans-Pecos region. These routes are located along the former routes of US 80 and US 290 and include Bus. I-10-C in Sierra Blanca, Bus. I-10-D in Van Horn, Bus. I-10-F in Balmorhea, and Bus. I-10-G in Fort Stockton.

I-10 has three auxiliary routes in Texas:
: A spur route in El Paso providing a connection over the Bridge of the Americas to Ciudad Juarez in Mexico
: The Connally Loop, a beltway around San Antonio
: The inner beltway around Houston

See also

Notes

References

External links

Katy Freeway In West Houston

10
 Texas
Transportation in El Paso County, Texas
Transportation in Hudspeth County, Texas
Transportation in Culberson County, Texas
Transportation in Jeff Davis County, Texas
Transportation in Reeves County, Texas
Transportation in Pecos County, Texas
Transportation in Crockett County, Texas
Transportation in Sutton County, Texas
Transportation in Kimble County, Texas
Transportation in Gillespie County, Texas
Transportation in Kerr County, Texas
Transportation in Kendall County, Texas
Transportation in Bexar County, Texas
Transportation in Caldwell County, Texas
Transportation in Guadalupe County, Texas
Transportation in Gonzales County, Texas
Transportation in Fayette County, Texas
Transportation in Colorado County, Texas
Transportation in Austin County, Texas
Transportation in Waller County, Texas
Transportation in Fort Bend County, Texas
Transportation in Harris County, Texas
Transportation in Chambers County, Texas
Transportation in Jefferson County, Texas
Transportation in Orange County, Texas